The 2016 Kobalt 400 was a NASCAR Sprint Cup Series race held on March 6, 2016, at Las Vegas Motor Speedway in Las Vegas. Contested over 267 laps on the  asphalt intermediate speedway, it was the third race of the 2016 NASCAR Sprint Cup Series season. Brad Keselowski won the race. Joey Logano finished second. Jimmie Johnson, Kyle Busch and Austin Dillon rounded out the top–five.

Kurt Busch won the pole for the race and led 31 laps on his way to a ninth-place finish. Johnson led a race high of 76 laps on his way to finishing third. There were 20 lead changes among 10 different drivers, as well as six caution flag periods for 36 laps.

This was the 18th career victory for Keselowski, first of the season, second at Las Vegas Motor Speedway and second at the track for Team Penske. Keselowski left Las Vegas sixth in points. Despite being the winning manufacturer, Ford left trailing Toyota by 11-points in the manufacturer standings.

The Kobalt 400 was carried by Fox Sports on the broadcast Fox network for the American television audience. The radio broadcast for the race was carried by the Performance Racing Network and Sirius XM NASCAR Radio.

Report

Background

Las Vegas Motor Speedway, located in Clark County, Nevada outside the Las Vegas city limits and about 15 miles northeast of the Las Vegas Strip, is a  complex of multiple tracks for motorsports racing. The complex is owned by Speedway Motorsports, Inc., which is headquartered in Charlotte, NC.

Entry list
The entry list for the Kobalt 400 was released on Monday, February 29 at 3:10 p.m. Eastern time. Thirty-nine cars are entered for the race. The only driver change from the previous race is Brian Vickers returning to the seat of the No. 14 Stewart-Haas Racing Chevrolet.

Test sessions

Session 1

Session 2
Denny Hamlin slammed the wall during the session and will use a backup car for the race. Because the change took place prior to qualifying, he won't start from the rear of the field. He said that the car "just snapped loose first lap after the changes.”

First practice

Qualifying

He said the car "was insanely fast. It’s amazing all the detail that goes into qualifying with finding that perfect lap three times out there. My second outing we were way tight and I didn’t know where it came from. “(Tony) Gibson, (crew chief) and crew went to town. They just adjusted on it. We gambled and we made that last session, which was great. That was icing on the cake to be able to go out into the third round. I was first or 12th it didn’t matter.” Joey Logano said that second for him was "so close. Second always stings the most. I felt like that last run I just – I told Todd that our car was close I just had to want it more. I pushed as hard as I could and got a little tight in one and two and that was enough to give up that speed we needed to get the pole tonight. I am so proud of what this Pennzoil team has done to pick up over last week. Dang it. It is so close. It was a lot of fun out there tonight and we are looking forward to Sunday.” Kyle Busch, who described his car as being "out of control" after qualifying 23rd, said that his "front tires were chattering, and there wasn’t much we were going to do to fix that out there." Carl Edwards switched to a backup car after making contact with the wall in the session. Because this took place after qualifying, he'll start from the rear of the field. He said that going to his backup was "frustrating because the car was really fast but they say the back-up is just as fast. I guarantee that car will be as good as this one."

Qualifying results

Practice (post-qualifying)

Second practice

Final practice

Race

First half

Start

Under clear Nevada skies, Kurt Busch led the field to the green flag at 4:11 p.m. After 10 laps, he pulled to a 1.5 second lead over Joey Logano. By lap 25, Logano cut the deficit in half. A number of cars began reporting pieces of trash lying all over the track due to the  gusts of wind. The first caution of the race flew on lap 31. It was a scheduled competition caution due to rain. Denny Hamlin exited pit road with the lead. Busch was tagged for being too fast on pit road and restarted the race from the tail-end of the field. Clint Bowyer was tagged for an uncontrolled tire and restarted the race from the tail-end of the field.

The race restarted on lap 36. Logano drove under Hamlin going into turn 3 to take the lead on lap 45. After 10 laps, he pulled to a two-second lead over Matt Kenseth. By lap 70, teammate Brad Keselowski chipped away half his lead. Kenseth was running fourth when he made an unscheduled stop on lap 74 for a loose wheel. He rejoined the race in 35th one lap down. A number of cars began pitting on lap 82. Logano hit pit road on lap 83 and handed the lead to Kevin Harvick. He pitted the next lap and Austin Dillon took the lead. He pitted the next lap and the lead cycled to Keselowski. A. J. Allmendinger was tagged for speeding on pit road and was forced to serve a pass-through penalty. Chris Buescher was tagged for an uncontrolled tire and was forced to serve a pass-through penalty.

Second quarter
Debris on the backstretch brought out the second caution of the race on lap 99. Keselowski and Logano swapped the lead on pit road with the former pitting before the start/finish line, but Jimmie Johnson exited pit road with the lead after taking just right-side tires.

The race restarted on lap 105. Logano took the lead from Johnson on lap 133, but Johnson passed him back the next lap. A number of cars began pitting on lap 141. These were the cars that took the wave-around under the second caution. It didn't stop Johnson from pitting on lap 149 and handing the lead over to Logano. He pitted on lap 151 and handed the lead to teammate Keselowski. He pitted on lap 154 and the lead cycled back to Johnson. Greg Biffle, Dillon, Kyle Larson and Ricky Stenhouse Jr. were all tagged for speeding on pit road and were forced to serve pass-through penalties.

Second half

Halfway
Dealing with lapped traffic going into turn 1, Logano passed Johnson to take the lead on lap 178. Debris in turn 1 brought out the third caution of the race on lap 179. Johnson and Logano swapped the lead on pit road with the latter exiting with the lead. Keselowski was tagged for speeding on pit road and restarted the race from the tail-end of the field. After the race, Paul Wolfe – Keselowski's crew chief – said that overcoming the penalty "talks about the whole team and how strong we are, how we continue to push. We had to overcome adversity today obviously. I think Brad and this team showed in the past there's no one I think that's any better at that. Getting that speeding penalty early on, you know, obviously wasn't ideal. No one gave up. Brad obviously continued to push hard and show the strength of the car."

The race restarted with 82 laps to go. The fourth caution of the race flew with 69 laps to go for a single-car spin in turn 2. Rounding the turn, Allmendinger clipped the left-rear corner of Larson's car and sent him spinning. The right-rear corner tagged the wall. Kenseth exited pit road with the race lead. The restart was held a few laps for a dust storm building up southeast of the track.

Fourth quarter
Despite a dust storm settling over the track, the race restarted with 64 laps to go. Johnson got a run on Kenseth exiting turn 4 and took the lead with 57 laps to go. The fifth caution of the race flew with 53 laps to go for a two-car wreck in turn 4. It appeared that Larson and Regan Smith got loose and slammed the wall. Logano opted not to pit when Johnson did and assumed the race lead.

The race restarted with 44 laps to go. Kyle Busch drove under Logano in turn 3 to take the lead with 43 to go. The sixth caution of the race flew for a multi-car wreck in turn 1. Going into the turn, Kenseth got loose, slid up the track and slammed the wall. Chase Elliott slammed into his rear. Checking up to avoid Kenseth, Kurt Busch got loose, clipped Carl Edwards and sent both of them spinning. Kenseth said he didn't "know what happened. I just turned off in there and spun off before I honestly knew what was happening. I don’t know why it spun out. I tried to save it the best I could and just got hit hard from behind and ended up wrecking it.” Elliott said what happened was "disappointing. What a fast race car. Just a terrible job on my behalf. It's pitiful. Run three races and finished one. Bad job on my end. I know better to miss a wreck like that.”

The race restarted with 35 laps to go. Busch shot out ahead of Logano and began to pull away. With 15 laps to go, that gap closed to less than a second. With 12 to go, he said his right-front tire was "falling apart." Keselowski closed in and passed Busch for the lead with five laps to go and drove on to score the victory.

Post-race

Driver comments
Keselowski described his day as "really, really great. It seemed like there were plenty of challenges, whether it was pit road or the weather or cautions. They threw everything they had at us today but this Miller Lite Ford team was too strong and we were able to fight them off and get to victory lane.”

After finishing runner-up, Logano said he's "finished second so many times this year already, and this whole weekend we finished second. Second in every qualifying round, during qualifying, second in practice on Friday, second in the race. Just so close. I want to break through and get a trophy eventually. Still, nothing to hold our heads down about.  It's not easy to finish second. I want to break through and get a trophy."

Kyle Busch said he "had a vibration when we put the rights on, and it just kept getting worse and worse. There at the end, I didn't know if a tire was coming off or what. And there at the end, I was trying to give it everything I had, but it would just not turn. It just go so tight, it was the tightest we were all day.” He also added that his car was "really, really bad this whole weekend, horrible. So, not a bad finish today considering. Not a win. But we have started top-fiving it and when we do that, the wins should come."

Following his fifth-place finish, Dillon said of his speeding penalty that he "did all I could there to get ourselves back in a position to get back on the lead lap. The caution fell perfect for us. It took a gutsy call there (by Labbe) to take the wave-around to get back on the lead lap, to see if the caution would come out. It did right in our window, so things fell our way there for sure. But what a fast racecar. We were running some lap times faster than the leader in the middle of the race when we were laps down. That's something we're really proud of."

After finishing sixth, Ryan Blaney said that it "was really satisfying. It was a good day for us. We needed a good finish after last week and it is nice to go out here and we all had fast cars. … We were able to drive up through the field early and made it better throughout the day. We had some spectacular late runs but we'd give up a little too much early and we couldn't ever get back what we lost. It's a great day.”

Race results

Race summary
 Lead changes: 20
 Cautions/Laps: 6 for 36
 Red flags: 0
 Time of race: 2 hours, 53 minutes and 55 seconds
 Average speed:

Media

Television
Fox Sports will be covering their 16th race at the Las Vegas Motor Speedway. Mike Joy, 2001 race winner Jeff Gordon and Darrell Waltrip will have the call in the booth for the race. Jamie Little, Vince Welch and Matt Yocum will handle the pit road duties for the television side.

Radio
PRN will have the radio call for the race which will also be simulcast on Sirius XM NASCAR Radio. Doug Rice, Mark Garrow and Wendy Venturini will call the race in the booth when the field is racing through the tri-oval. Rob Albright will call the race from a billboard in turn 2 when the field is racing through turns 1 and 2. Pat Patterson will call the race from a billboard outside of turn 3 when the field is racing through turns 3 and 4. Brad Gillie, Brett McMillan, Jim Noble and Steve Richards will work pit road for the radio side.

Standings after the race

Drivers' Championship standings

Manufacturers' Championship standings

Note: Only the first 16 positions are included for the driver standings.

Notes

References

Kobalt 400
Kobalt 400
NASCAR races at Las Vegas Motor Speedway
Kobalt 400